Albarradas Zapotec, in full Santo Domingo Albarradas Zapotec, is a Zapotec language of Oaxaca, Mexico. It is spoken in the towns of Santa María Albarradas, Santo Domingo Albarradas, and San Miguel Albarradas. The language of neighboring Santa Catarina Albarradas and San Antonio Albarradas is not mutually intelligible.

References

Zapotec languages